= Space Like Alice =

Australian rock band

- Origin: Melbourne, Victoria, Australia
- Past members: Scott Pioro; Chris Wheatley; Damian "Chilli" Capicchiano; Christian Bianco

Space Like Alice are an Australian rock band from Melbourne. Originally called Transistor, they changed to Space Like Alice, which was taken from Alice In Wonderland. They were signed to Wah Wah Records after Paul Kosky heard their demo. They released their first single in 2002, receiving extensive airplay, and then recorded an album, to be called Life is Sci-Fi, but due to internal problems at their label left their record company before they released anything more. They then started their own label, Rabbit Hole and released an EP and a single.

== Discography ==
=== EP ===
- On My Way Home (2004) – Rabbit Hole

=== Singles ===
List of singles, with selected chart positions
Title	Year	Peak chart positions
Title	Year	AUS
"Compensate"	2001	79
"Holiday"	2004	—
